Kingspan Group plc is a building materials company based in Ireland trading in over 70 countries with 159 factories employing over 15,000 people. The company operates with five divisions; Insulated Panels, Insulation, Light & Air, Water & Energy, and, Data & Flooring.

History
Founded in the 1960s by Eugene Murtagh, the company floated on the Irish Stock Exchange in 1989 with a value of IR£20m. It expanded into insulated panels and rigid insulation board via numerous greenfield plants, and acquisitions including the European insulation arm of CRH plc in 2010 and the construction division of ThyssenKrupp Steel in 2012. The year 2010 showed the first growth in sales for three years.

Acquisitions

Commitments

Innovation 
Kingspan Group's new global innovation centre, 'IKON', opened in 2019 in Kingscourt, Ireland, next to the head office. Designed by 'MILLIMETRE DESIGN' (Dublin), it comprises 18 Kingspan products serving as a 'state-of-the-art' place of research and living research project. The facility has been modelled with a Digital Twin and leverages input from sensors, IoT devices, Virtual Reality (VR), Autodesk Forge and BIM Data to further enhance operational efficiency.

Sustainability 
Approximately 39% of all greenhouse gas (CO2 and CO2e) emissions globally come from construction and buildings in operation so it is vital that more buildings decarbonise by incorporating insulation and using increasingly energy efficient appliances.

In 2020, Kingspan Group achieved its fourth appearance on CDP’s prestigious ‘A-list’ for climate change. Joining the Renewable Energy 100 (RE100) initiative in 2010, the Group achieved Net Zero Energy across all manufacturing and office facilities globally by 2019. In 2019, the Group joined the Circular Economy 100 (CE100) initiative as a member.

Kingspan Group also launched its 10-year ‘Planet Passionate’ sustainability programme in 2019, consisting of twelve targets focused on the four key areas of; Energy, Carbon, Circularity and Water. One carbon target is to achieve net zero carbon manufacturing and a '50% reduction in product CO2 intensity from primary supply partners'. One circularity target is to upcycle 1 billion PET bottles into insulation by 2025, up from 256 million in 2018.

Grenfell Tower fire

In November 2020, the official inquiry into the 2017 Grenfell Tower fire heard evidence from Kingspan ex-technical director Ivor Meredith that Kingspan insulation product Kooltherm K15 was used in the flammable cladding system mounted on to Grenfell Tower, despite Kingspan knowing that the product did not meet the required fire standard. Around 5% of the insulation in the cladding on the tower was manufactured by Kingspan whilst the rest was manufactured by a major competitor. A previous version of the product had passed fire tests, but Meredith described a fire test using the version of the product used on Grenfell as a "raging inferno", with the insulation "burning on its own steam".

Also in November 2020, the inquiry learned that Kingspan director Philip Heath had said, in 2008, that consultants who raised concerns about the combustibility of its product could "go f*ck themselves", and that they were "getting me confused with someone who gives a dam [sic]".

Near the end of November 2020, it emerged that Kingspan executives had sold at least £6.5M of shares in the company shortly before Kingspan's inquiry hearings were due to start. Kingspan's share price fell 15% over the course of the hearings.

On 8 December 2020, the inquiry saw evidence that in November 2016, Kingspan technical staff had acknowledged internally that Kingspan was selling its Kooltherm K15 foam insulation product as less flammable than it really was.

On 9 December 2020, the inquiry was told that after the Grenfell fire, Kingspan had invested in a smear campaign against rival companies' products. The campaign involved secretly using non-standard test rigs to artificially create the appearance that non-flammable rival products might in fact be flammable, and hiring lobbyists to push the results before policymakers such as the Housing, Communities and Local Government Committee and other MPs.

Mercedes Formula One Team sponsorship controversy
On 1 December 2021, the Mercedes F1 team signed a sponsorship deal with the Kingspan Group. This announcement drew criticism from Grenfell United and from UK government minister, Michael Gove. Mercedes subsequently agreed to review its decision and Mercedes F1 team boss, Toto Wolff, offered to meet and listen to the Grenfell fire survivors. On 8 December 2021, it was announced the deal between Kingspan and Mercedes F1 Team had been terminated with immediate effect.

See also 
List of companies of Ireland

References

External links

Companies listed on Euronext Dublin
Building materials companies
Manufacturing companies of Ireland
Construction and civil engineering companies of Ireland
Multinational companies headquartered in the Republic of Ireland
Irish brands
Construction and civil engineering companies established in 1966
Irish companies established in 1966